Diego Zúñiga (born 1987) is a Chilean writer and journalist. He was born in Iquique and spent his childhood there before moving to Santiago in his early teens. He studied journalism at the Pontifical Catholic University, and co-founded the publishing house Montacerdos. He has published three books till date: Camanchaca (novel, 2012),  Racimo (novel, 2014) and Niños héroes (short stories, 2016) and has won numerous domestic literary prizes. In 2017, he was included in the Bogota39 list of the best young Latin American writers.

References

1987 births
Living people
21st-century Chilean novelists
21st-century Chilean male writers
Chilean male novelists
Chilean male short story writers
21st-century Chilean short story writers